Elton Muçollari (born 14 September 1980) is an Albanian retired footballer who played several seasons in the Albanian Superliga.

Career stats

References

External links

1981 births
Living people
Footballers from Tirana
Albanian footballers
Association football midfielders
KF Laçi players
KF Teuta Durrës players
KS Kastrioti players
KF Tirana players
Besëlidhja Lezhë players
KF Korabi Peshkopi players
KS Sopoti Librazhd players
Kategoria Superiore players
Kategoria e Parë players